The 1992 Major League Baseball postseason was the playoff tournament of Major League Baseball for the 1992 season. The winners of each division advance to the postseason and face each other in a League Championship Series to determine the pennant winners that face each other in the World Series. 

In the American League, the Toronto Blue Jays returned to the postseason for second year in a row, and the Oakland Athletics returned for the fourth time in the past five seasons. In the National League, the Atlanta Braves made their second of fourteen consecutive postseason appearances, and the Pittsburgh Pirates were making their third straight appearance. 

This would be the last time the Pirates appeared in the postseason until 2013, as the team would experience 20 consecutive losing seasons afterward.

The playoffs began on October 6, 1992, and concluded on October 24, 1992, with the Blue Jays defeating the Braves in six games in the 1992 World Series. The Blue Jays became the first team from Canada to win the World Series.

Playoff seeds
The following teams qualified for the postseason:

American League
 Toronto Blue Jays - 96–66, Clinched AL East
 Oakland Athletics - 96–66, Clinched AL West

National League
 Pittsburgh Pirates - 96–66, Clinched NL East
 Atlanta Braves - 98–64, Clinched NL West

Playoff bracket

American League Championship Series

Toronto Blue Jays vs. Oakland Athletics

This was a rematch of the 1989 ALCS, which the Athletics won in five games en route to a World Series title. This time, the Blue Jays would emerge victorious, winning the series in six games to become the first team outside the United States to reach the World Series. 

Dave Stewart out-dueled Jack Morris as the Athletics won 4-3 in Game 1. Game 2 was another pitchers' duel between Toronto's David Cone and Oakland's Mike Moore, which would be won by the former as the Blue Jays evened the series with a 3-1 victory. When the series shifted to Oakland, the Blue Jays won Game 3, and then took Game 4 after 11 innings to go up 3-1 in the series. Stewart pitched a complete game for the Athletics in Game 5 as they won 6-2 to send the series back to Toronto. Game 5 was the last playoff game to be played at the Oakland-Alameda County Coliseum with the open air view, prior to the installment of Mount Davis in 1996. The Blue Jays blew out the Athletics in Game 6 to secure the pennant. This was the first time a team from Toronto appeared in a championship series of the four major North American sports leagues since the 1967 Stanley Cup Finals, which featured the Toronto Maple Leafs.

The Athletics would not return to the postseason again until the start of the "Moneyball" era in 2000. This was the last time the Athletics appeared in the ALCS until 2006, where they were swept by the Detroit Tigers. The Blue Jays would the AL pennant again the next year over the Chicago White Sox in six games.

The 1992 ALCS began a streak of playoff success for Toronto-based teams over their San Francisco Bay Area counterparts. In 1994, the Toronto Maple Leafs defeated the San Jose Sharks 4–3 in the second round of the 1994 Stanley Cup playoffs, then in 2019, the Toronto Raptors won the 2019 NBA Finals over the Golden State Warriors 4–2.

National League Championship Series

Atlanta Braves vs. Pittsburgh Pirates

This was a rematch of the previous year's series, which the Braves won in seven games. In what is considered by many to be one of the greatest playoff series in the history of North American sports, the Braves, despite blowing a 3-1 series lead, dispatched the Pirates in seven games yet again, capped off by a late rally by the Braves in the bottom of the ninth inning of Game 7.

Games 1 and 2 were dominated by the Braves - the Braves took Game 1 thanks to a stellar pitching performance by ace John Smoltz, and won Game 2 in a blowout to go up 2-0 in the series headed to Pittsburgh. The Pirates narrowly took Game 3 thanks to a complete game performance from Tim Wakefield, but in Game 4, Smoltz again led the Braves to victory to go up 3-1 in the series. However, the Pirates would not go away easily, as they blew out the Braves in Games 5 and 6 to force a seventh game. 

Game 7 was the most notable contest of the series. In the bottom of the ninth inning, the Pirates held a 2-1 lead and were one out away from returning to the World Series. However, the Braves had the bases loaded, and then Atlanta's Francisco Cabrera cracked a two-run single that scored David Justice and Sid Bream. Bream famously slid to score the Series-winning run, beating the throw by Pirates left fielder Barry Bonds.

The 1992 NLCS was the last postseason series ever played at Three Rivers Stadium. After the series loss, the Pirates fell into the beginning of an almost 20-year slump, posting 20 consecutive losing seasons. The Pirates would not return to the postseason again until 2013. 

The Braves returned to the NLCS the next year, but were upset by the Philadelphia Phillies in six games. They would win their next pennant in 1995, where they swept the Cincinnati Reds en route to winning the World Series.

1992 World Series

Toronto Blue Jays (AL) vs. Atlanta Braves (NL) 

This was the first World Series which had games hosted outside the United States. The Blue Jays defeated the Braves in six games to win their first World Series title in franchise history, becoming the first team from Canada to win the World Series, as well as the first Canadian team to win a championship other than the NHL’s Stanley Cup. 

Tom Glavine out-dueled Jack Morris in Game 1, as he pitched a complete game in a 3-1 Braves victory. In Game 2, the Blue Jays overcame a one-run Braves lead late thanks to a two-run home run from Ed Sprague Jr. in the top of the ninth, evening the series headed to Toronto. The Blue Jays took the lead in the series with a 3-2 win in Game 3. Jimmy Key out-dueled Glavine in Game 4 as the Blue Jays won 2-1 to take a 3-1 series lead. However, the Braves were not done yet. In Game 5, Morris was handed his second loss of the series as he was badly outdueled by John Smoltz as the Braves blew out the Blue Jays, 7-2, to send the series back to Atlanta. Game 6 went into extra innings, and the Blue Jays took the lead for good with two runs scored in the top of the eleventh. The Braves put up one more run in the bottom of the inning to cut the Blue Jays' lead to one, but relief pitcher Mike Timlin was able to preserve the lead as the Blue Jays clinched the title. This was the first major league championship won by a team from Toronto since 1967, when the NHL’s Toronto Maple Leafs won their 13th and most recent Stanley Cup.

The Braves would not return to the World Series until 1995 where they defeated the Cleveland Indians in six games. The Blue Jays returned to the World Series the following year, and defeated the Philadelphia Phillies in six games to repeat as champions.

References

External links
 League Baseball Standings & Expanded Standings - 1992

 
Major League Baseball postseason